Tania Cagnotto (born 15 May 1985) is an Italian diver. She is the first  female Italian diver to win a medal in a World Championship. A five-time Olympian, she won medals in both individual and synchronized springboard diving in her final appearance at the Olympics in 2016. She is also a 20-time champion at the European level.

Biography
Tania Cagnotto was born in Bolzano, the daughter of Giorgio Cagnotto and Carmen Casteiner. Her parents were both Olympic divers, with her father winning four Olympic medals in the 1970s and 1980s.

Cagnotto was sponsored by the sport section of the Italian police force, GN Fiamme Gialle – Bolzano Nuoto.

Cagnotto won her first European gold medal at the 2004 championships in Madrid at the age of 19, winning the 10-meter platform event and also receiving a bronze medal for her performance in the 3-meter springboard competition. After a disappointing performance in the 10-meter platform final round at the Montreal 2005 World Championships, she won the bronze medal in the 3-meter springboard event. Cagnotto won a third consecutive bronze medal in the 3-meter springboard at the Rome 2009 World Championships, after a 4th place in the 1-meter springboard event. Together with Francesca Dallapè, she also won a silver medal in the 3-meter springboard synchronized event. 

Cagnotto competed in the 2013 World Championships in Barcelona, getting the silver medal in 1m springboard only 0.1 marks behind champion He Zi. She won the gold medal in the 1-meter springboard at the 2015 FINA World Championship held in Kazan; she was the first Italian female diver to win a World Championship in diving. In the same event, Cagnotto also won the bronze medal in the 3-meter springboard. 

Cagnotto announced that the 2016 Summer Olympics in Rio de Janeiro, her fifth Olympic games, were to be her last competitive events. After narrowly missing medals in London, she finally won a silver in the 3m synchro (with her partner Francesca Dallapé) and bronze in the women's 3m.

Cagnotto competed in Torino in 12-14 May 2017 in 1m springboard as her last competition before retirement. She stated that she would coach diving after her ending her competitive career.

Olympic results

Personal life
Cagnotto is married to Stefano Parolin. She gave birth in Bolzano to their first child, daughter Maya, on 23 January 2018. In 2021 she gave birth to their second daughter, Lisa

See also
Italian sportswomen multiple medalists at Olympics and World Championships

References

External links
 

Italian female divers
1985 births
Living people
Sportspeople from Bolzano
Olympic divers of Italy
Divers at the 2000 Summer Olympics
Divers at the 2004 Summer Olympics
Divers at the 2008 Summer Olympics
Divers at the 2012 Summer Olympics
Divers at the 2016 Summer Olympics
Divers of Fiamme Gialle
World Aquatics Championships medalists in diving
Olympic silver medalists for Italy
Olympic bronze medalists for Italy
Olympic medalists in diving
Medalists at the 2016 Summer Olympics